Dekeyseria amazonica is a species of armored catfish endemic to Brazil where it is found in the Solimões and Amazon basins.  This species grows to a length of  SL.

References 
 

Ancistrini
Freshwater fish of Brazil
Endemic fauna of Brazil
Fish of the Amazon basin
Fish described in 1985